The 1987 NCAA basketball tournament was the 63rd season in the Philippine National Collegiate Athletic Association (NCAA). The Letran Knights successfully defended their championship in the Seniors division, while the San Beda Red Cubs clinched their first Juniors championship, returning from a leave of absence.

Seniors' tournament

Elimination round
Format:
Tournament divided into two halves: winners of the two halves dispute the championship in a best-of-3 finals series unless:
A team wins both rounds. In that case, the winning team automatically wins the championship.
A third team has a better cumulative record than both finalists. In that case, the third team has to win in a playoff against the team that won the second round to face the team that won in the first round in a best-of-3 finals series.

First round team standings

Second round team standings

Cumulative standings
No other team had a better cumulative record than the two pennant winners, so playoff for the Finals berth was not played.

San Sebastian clinched the first round pennant in the first round winning against Letran in their game, after a loss against Perpetual Help.

Letran denied San Sebastian the outright championship with a 94–91 overtime victory at the Rizal Memorial Coliseum. With Letran up, Jerry Ruiz fouled San Sebastian's Arnold Adlawan with 0.9 seconds left in regulation. Adlawan scored on a free-throw to tie the game at 82. In the overtime period, Letran never trailed as Fil-Am William Johnson and local Roberto Ruiz prevented San Sebastian's Eugene Quilban and foreign-student Napoleon Hatton from scoring. In the final three seconds of overtime, Letran's Fernando Libed, under medication for hepatitis, secured the win with a three-point play off a foul from Hatton.

Finals

Game 1

SSC National team player Paul Alvarez played sparingly. The Stags led early, but Letran had a 14–4 run to tie the score 58–all for the first time; Erwin Santos scored for Letran to put them up for the first time, 68–67 with 9:30 left in the game. Saturnino Garrido then scored all of his eight points in the final six minutes to bring the lead back to SSC for good at 75–68 with 6:27 left. Letran's center Alberto David fouled out which the Stags used to their advantage off quick baskets from Garrido and Eugene Quilban for an 81–70 lead. Letran cut the deficit to 79–87 but the Quilban and Napoleon Hatton scored in the final two minutes to prevent the Knights from a come-from-behind victory.

Game 2

After taking the halftime lead 50–47, Letran and San Sebastian remained close, but Letran pulled away in the fourth quarter off team captain Fernando Libed's eight points to give Letran an 84–79 lead. The Stags rallied to tie the game 90–all after trailing by eight points: Alvarez scored on a fastbreak and two free-throws off a foul from David, Garrido scored on a jump-shot, then Quilban converted on a lay-up to tie the score. Robert Ruiz scored on two free-throws for Letran off Garrido's foul to put Letran up, 92–90. Rookie Erwin Santos, playing for Libed who was suffering from cramps, blocked Garrido's shot with 14 seconds remaining; with three seconds left, he then intercepted Alvarez' pass to Arnold Adlawan. The Stags then resorted to fouling Ruiz, who made one of his two free-throws as time expired to tie the series for a deciding third game.

Game 3

San Sebastian led 31–18 when SSC coach Tolentino placed Hatton or Allan de los Reyes as safety men to prevent Letran's fastbreaks. Hatton scored six more points to extend SSC's lead to 37–25, but William Johnson and Arthur Ayson scored for Letran to cut the lead to eight 29–37 at the half. Letran scored on fastbreaks to seize the lead 45–40 but Alvarez and Hatton scored to bring back the lead to the Stags 58–53 with 5:54 to go. Further scoring from the two gave the Stags a 62–55 edge with 4:52 left. San Sebastian then opted to dribble away at their possessions, including waiving their free-throw attempts, while Letran cut the SSC lead to one point 62–61. At the last SSC possession, Quilban dribbled away at the top of the key, but the ball got stranded at the low post that resulted in a missed shot from Rizaldo Bade. Roberto Ruiz grabbed the rebound for Letran, passed to David at midcourt who passed the ball to Ayson. Ayson passed the ball to Libed, who drove to the basket and converted a jump-shot off the Stags' Melchor Teves, de los Reyes and Hatton with 1.2 seconds left, to secure Letran's defense of the championship. Letran coach Eddie Reyes wore the same shirt he won on the 1986 championship-clinching game also against San Sebastian. The Letran faithful gave their Santo Niño a victory ride after the game's conclusion.

Juniors' tournament
The San Beda Red Cubs won the juniors' championship, their first after their return from a leave of absence from 1983 to 1985.

See also
UAAP Season 50 men's basketball tournament

References

63
1987 in Philippine basketball